Neotonnoiria is a genus of flies in the family Dolichopodidae. It is known from Brazil, Panama, Costa Rica and Peru, and contains only one species, Neotonnoiria maculipennis. The genus was originally named Tonnoiria by Octave Parent in 1929; however, this was preoccupied by Tonnoiria Malloch, 1929, so it was renamed to Neotonnoiria by Harold E. Robinson (1970).

References

Dolichopodidae genera
Neurigoninae
Diptera of North America
Diptera of South America
Monotypic Diptera genera
Taxa named by Harold E. Robinson